The Patiala House is the former residence of the Maharaja of Patiala in Delhi. It is situated near India Gate in central Delhi, India.

History
It was designed by Sir Edwin Lutyens. The building has a central dome with a "butterfly" layout, similar to other Lutyens’ buildings.

Unlike some of the princely residences in Delhi, the Patiala House is not clad in sandstone but painted white.

When prime minister Indira Gandhi abolished the privy purses of the royals in the 1970s, the royal family sold it to the Indian government.

It has been used by District Courts of India as one of its five courts in Delhi and is known as the Patiala House Courts Complex, which has seen numerous extensions and changes that have altered the original appearance of the palace.

See also 
 Hyderabad House
 Bikaner House
 Baroda House
 Jaipur House
 Jodhpur House

References

Further reading

External links 
 
 Image of the Patiala House

Royal residences in Delhi
Works of Edwin Lutyens in India
Patiala